T27 may refer to:

Aviation 
 Embraer T-27 Tucano, a Brazilian trainer
 Horizon Airport (El Paso, Texas)
 Junkers T 27, German experimental trainer

Other uses 
 T-27, a Soviet tankette
 
 Gordon Murray Automotive T.27, a city car
 Shōwachō Station (Kagawa), in Takamatsu, Kagawa, Japan
 T27 Armored Car, an American prototype armored car
 Tennōji Station, in Osaka, Japan